Paracles burmeisteri is a moth of the subfamily Arctiinae first described by Berg in 1877. It is found in Argentina.

The larvae feed on Potamogeton species.

References

Moths described in 1877
Paracles